The Wertpapierkennnummer (WKN, WPKN, WPK or Wert), is a German securities identification code. It is composed of six digits or capital letters (excluding I and O), and no check digit.

Changes in format 

There have been several changes in the WKN definition:
 WKN were switched from numeric to alphanumeric on 21 July 2003
 The first 2–4 Letters may show the issuer of the Instrument.
 Until March 2000, the WKNs were divided into different number ranges that represented different types of securities (e.g., stocks, warrants, funds, etc.).

The WKNs and DE-ISINs are provided by WM-Datenservice.

WKNs may be obsolete in future, since they may be replaced by International Securities Identification Numbers (ISINs).

Spelling and meaning 

Like most very long German words, Wertpapierkennnummer is a compound word: Wert-Papier-Kenn-Nummer, if translated literally, means value–paper–identification–number (Wertpapier = financial security; Kennnummer = identification number).

Before the German spelling reform of 1996 the correct spelling was Wertpapierkennummer with only two consecutive n’s, since the orthography rules allowed the same consonant three times in a row only under special circumstances.  Since the reform, the spelling has been Wertpapierkennnummer with three consecutive n’s.

See also
CUSIP
ISIN
SEDOL

References 

Security identifier types
Banking in Germany
Financial metadata